Mozambique was an overseas possession of Portugal until 1975. On June 25, 1975, Portugal granted independence to Mozambique, much later than other European nations had freed their own African possessions.

The United States immediately recognized the new nation and moved to establish diplomatic relations. An embassy in the capital Maputo (then named Lourenço Marques) was opened November 8, 1975, with Johnnie Carson as chargé d’affaires ad interim. On February 4, 1976, Ambassador Willard Ames De Pree was appointed as the first Ambassador Extraordinary and Plenipotentiary to Mozambique.

Ambassadors

Notes

See also
Mozambique – United States relations
Foreign relations of Mozambique
Ambassadors of the United States

Sources
United States Department of State: Background notes on Mozambique

External links
 United States Department of State: Chiefs of Mission for Mozambique
 United States Department of State: Mozambique
 United States Embassy in Maputo

Mozambique
 
United States